State Route 107 (SR 107) is a state highway in the U.S. state of California that forms part of Hawthorne Boulevard in the Los Angeles Area from State Route 1 (Pacific Coast Highway) in Torrance north to Redondo Beach Boulevard at the Redondo Beach–Lawndale border.

Route description
Route 107 begins at State Route 1 in south Torrance and runs north along Hawthorne Boulevard in its entirety. (Hawthorne Boulevard continues south of Route 1 as Los Angeles County Route N-7.) The route is a principal arterial surface road in its entirety with grade crossings and maintains a wide right-of-way, often having as many as eight lanes and maintaining a 40 mph (60 km/h) speed limit. Route 107 goes through light and medium industrial areas and office towers. It also comes in contact with two malls: The South Bay Galleria and the Del Amo Fashion Center. It only met one other route along the way: State Route 91 at Artesia Boulevard, which has since been deleted.

SR 107 is part of the California Freeway and Expressway System, and is part of the National Highway System, a network of highways that are considered essential to the country's economy, defense, and mobility by the Federal Highway Administration.

History
In 1964, Route 107 was defined to run past Interstate 405 along Hawthorne Boulevard, which renamed itself La Brea Avenue upon entering Inglewood at Century Boulevard, then turned west on Centinela Avenue to meet Interstate 405 again in Culver City. In 1965, the portion from Route 405 in Lawndale to Route 405 in Culver City was deleted. It was to have been upgraded to a freeway and was tentatively named the "Torrance Freeway."

Until 1998, Route 107 continued further north to Interstate 405. In 1998, state law was changed to allow the relinquishment of Route 107 to the City of Lawndale. In 2003, the legislative definition was updated to eliminate the portion in Lawndale. The route currently ends at Redondo Beach Boulevard at the city limits of Lawndale.

Major intersections

See also

References

External links

California @ AARoads.com - State Route 107 and Los Angeles County N7
Caltrans: Route 107 highway conditions
California Highways: SR 107

107
State Route 107
Lawndale, California
Redondo Beach, California
Torrance, California